Shaggy is a 1948 American drama film directed by Robert Emmett Tansey, written by Maxwell Shane and filmed in Cinecolor. The film stars Brenda Joyce, Georgie Nokes, Robert Shayne, Jody Gilbert, Ralph Sanford and Alex Frazer. The film was released on June 11, 1948 by  Paramount Pictures.

Plot
The film follows the story of a rancher's son, Robbie, his dog Shaggy and adventures they have with ranching neighbors and wild animals in the U.S. west.

Cast 
Brenda Joyce as Laura Calvin
Georgie Nokes as Robbie Calvin
Robert Shayne as Bob Calvin
Jody Gilbert as Tessie
Ralph Sanford as Fuzzy
Alex Frazer as Mac
William Haade as Gonnell
Dan White as Joe Simms

Production
The budget was larger than for a typical film from Pine-Thomas Productions, ranging from $250,000 to $300,000.

References

External links 
 
Shaggy at TCMDB
Shaggy at BFI

1948 films
1940s English-language films
Paramount Pictures films
American drama films
1948 drama films
Films directed by Robert Emmett Tansey
Films scored by Raoul Kraushaar
Films about dogs
Cinecolor films
1940s American films
Films set in the Western United States